That Championship Season is a 1972 play by Jason Miller.

That Championship Season  may also refer to:

 That Championship Season (1982 film), a film adaptation directed by Jason Miller
 That Championship Season (1999 film), a TV film adapted by Jason Miller and directed by Paul Sorvino